A pooh-pooh (also styled as poo-poo) is a fallacy in informal logic that consists of dismissing an argument as being unworthy of serious consideration. Scholars generally characterize the fallacy as a rhetorical device in which the speaker ridicules an argument without responding to the substance of the argument. It has been characterized as a form of a straw man fallacy, where an argument is described as inherently worthless or undeserving of serious attention. Some authors have also described the fallacy as the act of "ridicul[ing]" an argument as though it were "a myth", and some characterize it as the act of dismissing an argument "with insults without responding to its substance in any way". Other authors describe the fallacy as the act of dismissing an argument "with the wave of a hand". Some sources also suggest the fallacy is an expression that involves "sneer[ing]", "ridicule", or "malicious comments about the proponent of the argument".Some authors also suggest the term originated as a "representation of the act of spitting in sign of contemptuous rejection". There is no evidence of a relationship with the slang word for feces.

See also

 Hasty generalization
 Appeal to ridicule
 List of fallacies

References

Relevance fallacies